Susano may refer to:

 Susanoo, the Shinto god of the sea and storms
 Susano, Brazil,  a city in São Paulo, Brazil
 Susano Oh, a Japanese manga created by Go Nagai
 Susanoo, a jutsu used by several Uchihas in the manga and anime series Naruto